Jean Béraud (January 12, 1849  – October 4, 1935) was a French painter renowned for his numerous paintings depicting the life of Paris, and the nightlife of Paris society.  Pictures of the Champs Elysees, cafés, Montmartre and the banks of the Seine are precisely detailed illustrations of everyday Parisian life during the "Belle Époque". He also painted religious subjects in a contemporary setting.

Biography

Béraud was born in Saint Petersburg. His father (also called Jean) was a sculptor and was likely working on the site of St. Isaac's Cathedral at the time of his son's birth. Béraud's mother was one Geneviève Eugénie Jacquin; following the death of Béraud's father, the family moved to Paris. Béraud was in the process of being educated as a lawyer until the occupation of Paris during the Franco-Prussian war in 1870.

Béraud became a student of Léon Bonnat, and exhibited his paintings at the Salon for the first time in 1872. However, he did not gain recognition until 1876, with his On the Way Back from the Funeral. He exhibited with the Society of French Watercolorists at the 1889 World's Fair in Paris. 

He painted many scenes of Parisian daily life during the Belle Époque in a style that stands somewhere between the academic art of the Salon and that of the Impressionists. He received the Légion d'honneur in 1894.

Béraud's paintings often included truth-based humour and mockery of late 19th-century Parisian life, along with frequent appearances of biblical characters in then contemporary situations. Paintings such as Mary Magdalene in the House of the Pharisees aroused controversy when exhibited, because of these themes.

Towards the end of the 19th century, Béraud dedicated less time to his own painting but worked on numerous exhibition committees, including the Salon de la Société Nationale. Béraud never married and had no children. He died in Paris on October 4, 1935, and is buried in Montparnasse Cemetery beside his mother.

Style
Béraud was popular in France, and was appreciated by Guy de Maupassant who called him "adorable's adversaries" (Le plus charmant des fantaisistes).

However, his work was completely ignored by art historians of the period. After the Revolution, Russian artists received Béraud's work with irony, seeing them as the embodiment of Western commercial consumption, indulging, in their opinion, in the bourgeois tastes of the rich middle-class.
Painting style gradually shifted from academic towards impressionism. However, while the major Impressionists fled the chaotic milieu of Paris and painted landscapes of the surrounding areas, Béraud – like his friend Édouard Manet (1832–1883), and in some of his paintings, Edgar Degas (1834–1917) – depicted the busy environment of late-nineteenth-century urban life. Artistic techniques used by Béraud, in particular, when drawing the so-called À la salle Graffard, were later adopted by other artists. The upper part of the picture is hidden in a light haze, the spectators are depicted in the foreground enthusiastically responding to the speech,  while the Anarchist speakers stand out against a darker background.

Gallery

References

Sources
 Patrick Offenstadt, The Belle Epoque : A Dream of Times Gone by Jean Béraud, Taschen - Wildenstein Institute, Paris, 1999.
 Tate Collection | Jean Béraud at www.tate.org.uk
 artnet.com

External links
 

1849 births
1935 deaths
Artists from Paris
Lycée Condorcet alumni
École des Beaux-Arts alumni
19th-century French painters
19th-century French male artists
French male painters
French portrait painters
French genre painters
20th-century French painters
20th-century French male artists
Officiers of the Légion d'honneur
Academic art
Burials at Montmartre Cemetery
Members of the Ligue de la patrie française
Belle Époque